The 1949 Army Cadets football team represented the United States Military Academy in the 1949 college football season.  The Cadets scored 354 points, while the defense allowed only 68 points. Arnold Galiffa was the starting quarterback, ahead of Earl Blaik's son, Bob. Johnny Trent was the team captain. The Cadets won the Lambert-Meadowlands Trophy as the best college team in the East. At season’s end, Red Blaik confessed that he thoughts of retiring.

Offseason
Sid Gillman left Army to become the head coach for the University of Cincinnati. Head coach Red Blaik interviewed Vince Lombardi, but harbored doubts that Lombardi's background as a high school coach would prepare him for the job.

Coaching staff
Besides Lombardi, Murray Warmath of Tennessee was the other new face on the coaching staff. Lombardi would focus on offense, while Warmath worked on the defense. They were the only civilian coaches on the staff. In November 1934, Lombardi (with Fordham) faced off against Warmath (playing for Tennessee) with Fordham winning the game 13-12. The other members of the staff included Doug Kenna, Paul Amen, and John Sauer.

Schedule

Roster
 QB Bob Blaik
 Elmer Stout #26

Accusations of dirty play
There were accusations that Army played dirty. Against the University of Michigan, Wolverine’s halfback Chuck Ortmann was knocked unconscious. The accusation was that Army player Gil Stephenson kicked him. The matter was escalated when Michigan professor of Geology, WH Hobbs was interviewed by the Michigan Daily and commented on the play. The press continued to establish Army’s notoriety as bullies after convincing wins over Harvard 54-14, and Columbia 63-6.
Army hosted Vince Lombardi’s former team, the Fordham Rams at Michie Stadium. One of the members of the Rams was Vince’s brother, Joe Lombardi, who transferred to the school after Lombardi left. Tim Cohane, writer of Look Magazine was a Fordham alumnus, and a friend of Army coach Red Blaik. He pressured both teams to play each other. Cohane felt the game would help Fordham rise to national prominence. Herb Seidell, the Fordham captain, lost a tooth in the game. Several fights ensued and the media named the match, the Donnybrook on the Hudson. There were multiple penalties for unnecessary roughness.

References

Army
Army Black Knights football seasons
Lambert-Meadowlands Trophy seasons
College football undefeated seasons
Army Cadets football